Zona Franca – Port is an area of Barcelona (Catalonia) in the district of Sants-Montjuïc.  The area includes the Polígon Industrial de la Zona Franca and the Port of Barcelona.

It is in the south of Barcelona and south-east of l'Hospitalet de Llobregat.

See also
Zona Franca (Barcelona)

References

Sants-Montjuïc